Harilaqi is a village in the municipality of Fushë Kosovë, in Republic of Kosovo

History 

The village has one of the most antique Castles in Balkan known as "Kalaja e Harilaqit"

Until 1988 the village belonged to the municipality of Pristina, when it was included in the newly-formed Fushë Kosovë municipality.

Notes

References 

Villages in Kosovo Polje
Medieval Serbian sites in Kosovo